L.A. Guns is an American hard rock band from Los Angeles, California. Formed in 1983, the group originally included guitarist Tracii Guns, lead vocalist Mike Jagosz, bassist Ole Beich and drummer Rob Gardner. The band has been through numerous lineup changes since its inception, and currently has two versions. Guns' version includes Tracii Guns, lead vocalist and former rhythm guitarist Phil Lewis (from 1987 to 1995, and since 1999), bassist Johnny Martin (since 2016), rhythm guitarist Ace Von Johnson (since 2018), Studio drummer Adam Hamilton (since 2020, formerly bassist from 2001 to 2007 and rhythm guitarist in 2018) and live drummer Shane Fitzgibbon (from 2016 to 2019, and since 2021). Riley's version includes drummer Steve Riley, bassist Kelly Nickels, lead guitarist Scotty Griffin and singer/rhythm guitarist Kurt Frohlich.

History

1983–2002: Early years and initial success
L.A. Guns was formed by guitarist Tracii Guns (real name Tracy Ulrich) with lead vocalist Michael Jagosz, bassist Ole Beich and drummer Rob Gardner. Jagosz was briefly replaced by Axl Rose (then using his real name William Bailey) who had previously fronted Rapidfire and Hollywood Rose. After a short stay in jail, Jagosz returned to the band as they released their first EP Collector's Edition No. 1 in 1985. When Hollywood Rose disbanded, Guns and Rose merged their groups to form the first incarnation of Guns N' Roses in March 1985. New L.A. Guns vocalist Paul Black subsequently took over leadership of the band, adding guitarist Robert Stoddard, bassist Mick Cripps and drummer Nickey "Beat" Alexander as its new members. By June, Guns had been replaced in Guns N' Roses by Slash, at which point he returned to L.A. Guns.

In 1987, L.A. Guns signed a record deal with PolyGram and introduced new members in lead vocalist Phil Lewis (formerly of Girl and Tormé) and bassist Kelly Nickels (formerly of Faster Pussycat), with Cripps moving over to guitar. The band recorded their self-titled debut album later in the year, replacing Alexander with Steve Riley before its release. The formation of Lewis, Guns, Cripps, Nickels and Riley is considered the "classic lineup" of L.A. Guns. This lineup remained stable until January 1992, when Riley was fired and replaced by Michael "Bones" Gersema. The new drummer performed on 1994's Vicious Circle, but had been replaced by the returning Riley by the time the album's promotional tour started. L.A. Guns was subsequently dropped by PolyGram, and Lewis and Cripps left the band.

In July 1995, Lewis and Cripps were replaced by Chris Van Dahl and Johnny Crypt, respectively. Nickels left later in the year, with Crypt taking over on bass. The four-piece band released American Hardcore in 1996. The following year, Ralph Saenz replaced Van Dahl and performed on the EP Wasted, released in 1998. Saenz was briefly replaced by Joe Lesté, and later Jizzy Pearl. Crypt left in early 1999, after recording his parts for Shrinking Violet. He was briefly replaced by Stefan Adika, and later by Chuck Garric. Lewis, Cripps and Nickels returned for a reunion of the "classic lineup" in September 1999, releasing a live album and two albums of re-recorded material. Cripps and Nickels were replaced by Brent Muscat and Mark "Muddy Stardust" Dutton, respectively, for a summer 2000 tour, before Cripps returned again. He left again after the release of Man in the Moon. Adam Hamilton replaced Stardust in late 2001, and Keff Ratcliffe joined in June 2002.

2002–2016: Departure of Guns; two lineups
L.A. Guns cancelled their support slot on Alice Cooper's upcoming tour in October 2002, with Lewis accusing Guns of prioritising his new group Brides of Destruction, and the guitarist blaming the band's management and miscommunications for the situation. The band quickly returned to performing live, with former W.A.S.P. guitarist Chris Holmes taking Guns' place. By the following month, both Holmes and Ratcliffe had left the band, to be replaced by Keri Kelli and the returning Muscat, respectively. Muscat left in mid-2003, but returned when Kelli left the band in December. However, he also left the band shortly thereafter. In January 2004, former Roxx Gang member Stacey Blades (real name Bryan MaClachlan) was announced as the sole guitarist in L.A. Guns.

In March 2006, Tracii Guns announced that he would be touring with former L.A. Guns members Paul Black and Nickey Alexander, plus bassist Jeremy Guns, to perform hits from the various groups with which he had been involved during his career. The group was initially dubbed the Tracii Guns Band, but was later rebranded as L.A. Guns by the eponymous guitarist. Both versions of the band continued touring and recording new music concurrently. Guns' version of the band went through multiple lineup changes of its own, before the guitarist renamed the group Tracii Guns' League of Gentlemen and distanced it from the original project. The League of Gentlemen remained active, releasing The First Record in 2013 followed by The Second Record in 2014.

The original L.A. Guns remained stable with a lineup of Lewis, Blades, Hamilton and Riley until March 2007, when Hamilton left the band to focus on his work as a record producer. Scotty Griffin was announced as his replacement a few days later. Griffin remained until July 2009, when he left to focus on The King Mixers; he was replaced by Kenny Kweens, who had recently left Beautiful Creatures. Griffin returned in January 2011, after Kweens decided to leave. This lineup released Hollywood Forever – its first studio album in seven years – in June 2012. After six months touring for the album, Blades announced his departure from L.A. Guns in December 2012 due to "extenuating circumstances and musical differences". Frank Wilsey was announced as the guitarist's replacement a week later, however a month later he was replaced by former Endeverafter frontman Michael Grant. In September 2014, Kweens replaced Griffin for a second time as the band's bassist.

2016 onwards: Guns returns to the group
In September 2016, it was announced that Tracii Guns would be rejoining L.A. Guns for the first time since leaving in 2002, after the guitarist had reunited with vocalist Phil Lewis at several shows the previous year billed as "L.A. Guns' Phil Lewis and Tracii Guns". On December 1, Lewis announced that he would no longer be a member of the band as of January 1, 2017; however, it was quickly added by the group's new label Frontiers Records that the vocalist was referring to the version of the band featuring bassist Kenny Kweens and drummer Steve Riley, who would be replaced with Johnny Martin and Shane Fitzgibbon, respectively. The band released The Missing Peace in 2017, which was the first studio album by Lewis and Guns together in 15 years. After touring in promotion of the release, Michael Grant left L.A. Guns in March 2018. Although his departure was initially announced to be his choice, Grant later claimed that he was fired for "absolutely no reason".

Grant was initially replaced by Johnny Monaco, who had recently left Enuff Z'Nuff. However, by June he had left the band and been replaced by former bassist Adam Hamilton, with Lewis claiming that Monaco "hated the travel and just wanted to focus on his own stuff". Hamilton had left again by early 2019, with Ace Von Johnson taking his place. In March 2019, Fitzgibbon also left and was replaced by Scot Coogan. Riley launched his own version of L.A. Guns in December 2018, enlisting Jacob Bunton on vocals, Scotty Griffin on guitar and Kelly Nickels on bass. In April 2019, Kurt Frohlich replaced Bunton as the group's frontman.

Members

Current L.A. Guns band members

Former L.A. Guns band members

Tracii Guns' L.A. Guns members

Steve Riley's L.A. Guns members

Timeline

Lineups

L.A. Guns band lineups

Tracii Guns' L.A. Guns lineups

Steve Riley's L.A. Guns lineups

References

External links
L.A. Guns official website

L.A. Guns
L.A. Guns band members